The College of Engineering, Thalassery (COET) is one of the six engineering colleges under CAPE (Co-operative Academy of Professional Education), established by the government of Kerala in the year 2000 and is affiliated to APJ Abdul Kalam Technological University (KTU) and Cochin University of Science and Technology (CUSAT). Approved by the All India Council for Technical Education (AICTE). The mechanical and electrical departments were accredited by National Board of Accreditation in 2018.
The college is located at Kundoormala, near Eranholi (West Ponniam), which is a township 6.5 km east of Thalassery on the Thalassery - Coorg highway route. The sprawling campus spread over 25 acres of land provides an ideal atmosphere for the pursuit of knowledge.

The courses offered at B.tech level are civil engineering, computer science and engineering, electronics and communication engineering, electrical and electronics Engineering, information technology, and mechanical engineering. Courses at M.tech level are electronics and communication engineering, and mechanical engineering. Also offered are MBA and Ph.D. programs in electronics and communication engineering. The duration of course for B.tech is four academic years and for M.tech is two academic years as prescribed in the curriculum. University examinations are conducted at the end of the semester.

Admission to this college is purely based on the common entrance examination (CEE) conducted by the government of Kerala.a d

Transportation 

Location : Kundoormala, Nayanar Road Via, Eranholi (PO), Thalassery-670107, India.

The site is easily accessible by road. One can alight at the Thalassery town bus stand and catch one of the frequent buses to Kuthuparamba and alight at Nayanar road. Those travelling by train should alight at Thalassery Railway Station and get the bus to Kuthuparamba from the Thalassery town bus stand.

Student activities

Agnitus
Agnitus is a tech fest that is annually conducted on the college. People from all over the country come and participate in this national tech fest.

Spandanam
Spandanam is a festival that consists of a wide range of art genres which include music, dance, literature, poetry, etc. which helps the students in learning and building a strong cultural belief. It is conducted once in a year and encourages the budding artists to show their talents and take the celebration spirit out of the festival.

AI Fest 2.0 
AI Fest 2.0 is an event organized by IEDC COET, March 22-23 of 2019.

Placement cell 
An excellent career guidance and placement unit is functioning in the college with the objective of providing career guidance and placement opportunities to the students. The Principal and all other faculty members have extended their wholehearted support to the functioning of the unit, which acts as a morale booster to career conscious students and concentrates on multidimensional personality development of the students. The unit nurtures industry-readiness and employability of the graduates.

Courses

The college was affiliated with Cochin University of Science and Technolog. Since 2015, the college is affiliated to Kerala Technological University.

The COET offers B.tech degree in engineering in six subjects:
Civil engineering
Computer science and engineering 
Electrical and electronics engineering
Electronics and communication engineering
Information technology 
Mechanical engineering
The intake is 420 students per year.

The COET offers M.tech degree in engineering in two subjects:

Electronics and communication engineering
Signal processing

Mechanical engineering
Manufacturing systems and management

The COET offers a doctorate in one engineering subject:
Electronics and communication engineering

Departments

Engineering 

 Civil engineering
 Computer science and engineering
 Electrical and electronics engineering
 Electronics and communication Engineering
 Information technology
 Mechanical engineering

Non-engineering 
 MBA program under CUSAT
 Applied science and humanities
 Physical education

Facilities 
Central computing facility

Infrastructure

Hostel

Transportation

Central library-the library is located at central position of the campus attached to the administrative block and is open in all days except Sundays, 2nd Saturdays and government holidays. The central library of the college has a collection of books, e-books, journals, periodicals, newspaper, CDs and DVDs, and  back volumes. Members of the library are students, teachers, non teaching staffs of the college.

Campus LAN and wifi-24-hour high-speed internet connection

Seminar hall

Canteen

Co-operative store

Sports

Fee payment

See also
List of Engineering Colleges in Kerala
 Educational Institutions in Thalassery
APJ Abdul Kalam Technological University
All India Council for Technical Education

References

External links 
 

Universities and colleges in Kannur district
Education in Thalassery
Educational institutions established in 2000
2000 establishments in Kerala
Engineering colleges in Kannur district